The Life-Sized City is a Canadian television documentary series which premiered on TVOntario in 2017. Hosted by Mikael Colville-Andersen, the series visits various world cities, where it profiles innovative local urban development and improvement projects that are changing and revitalizing city life.

The series received five Canadian Screen Award nominations at the 6th Canadian Screen Awards, and two at the 7th Canadian Screen Awards.

The series has been rebroadcast by Knowledge Network in British Columbia, as well as internationally on Finland's Yle (as Ihmisen Kaupunki), Denmark's DR (as Det fantastiske byliv), Austria's ServusTV, Belgium's VRT, Poland's TVN24, Italy's LaEffe (as Racconti dalle citta del futuro), and France's Planète+ (as Des villes à hauteur d'hommes).

Episodes

Season 1

Season 2

Season 3

References

External links

2010s Canadian documentary television series
TVO original programming
2017 Canadian television series debuts